The prix Vérité is a French literary award bestowed by the commune of Le Cannet in the Alpes-Maritimes department of southeastern France..

Established in 1986 by Michèle Tabarot, the prize rewards each year a book about a contemporary event based on one or more personally experienced facts. The prize is awarded by a jury composed of journalists, senior reporters, writers and former laureates

It places special emphasis on exceptional men and women, witnesses of the great events of our time, with an unconditional conviction or determination to fulfill their commitments.

Liste of winners

2009 
 Prix Vérité: Jean-Louis Bruguière: Ce que je n’ai pas pu dire, Robert Laffont,  
 Prix spécial du Jury Prix Vérité:  Au fil des notes. Plon,

2008

2007 
 Prix Vérité: May Chidiac and Amal Moghaizel: Le ciel m'attendra. - Éditions Florent Massot
 Prix spécial du Jury Prix Vérité: Íngrid Betancourt and Lionel Duroy: La Rage au cœur -
 Bernard Fixot and Marcel Rufo: La Vie en désordre -

2006 
 Prix Vérité: Bernard Borrel: Un juge assassiné - Flammarion
 Prix spécial du Jury Prix Vérité: Dahina Le Guennan : Inavouable Vérité - Albin Michel

2005 
 Prix Vérité : Somaly Mam : Le Silence de l’innocence - Éditions Anne Carrière
 Prix spécial du Jury Prix Vérité : Sediqa Massoud, Marie-Françoise Colombani and Chékéba Hachemi: Pour l’amour de Massoud - Ed XO, 
 Prix Vérité for life achievement: Patrick Poivre d’Arvor

2004 
 Prix Vérité: Dominique Bromberger: Un aller-Retour - Robert Laffont 
 Prix Ville du Cannet: Esther Mujawayo et Souâd Belhaddad: SurVivantes - Editions de l’Aube

2003 
 Prix Vérité: Mariane Pearl: Un cœur invaincu - Plon
 Prix Ville du Cannet: Jean-Marc Sylvestre: Une petite douleur à l’épaule gauche Ramsay

2002 
 Prix Vérité: Bruno Dellinger: World Trade Center 47e étage - Robert Laffont
 Prix Ville du Cannet: Françoise Laborde : Pourquoi ma mère me rend folle - Ramsay

2001 
 Prix Vérité: Marina Picasso : Grand-Père - Éditions Denoël
 Prix Ville du Cannet: Bruno de Stabenrath: Cavalcade - Robert Laffont

2000 
 Prix Vérité: Laurence de la Ferrière: Seule dans le vent des glaces - Robert Laffont 
 Prix Ville du Cannet: Jean-Jacques Le Garrec: Évasions - XO

1999 
 Prix Vérité : Jacques Chancel: L’Or et le Rien - Plon 
 Prix Vérité pour l’ensemble de son œuvre : Marcel Jullian

1998 
 Prix Vérité: Maurice Herzog: L’Autre Annapurna - Robert Laffont 
 Prix Ville du Cannet: Jean Bertolino : La Frontière des Fous - Flammarion

1997 
 Prix Vérité: Thierry Jean-Pierre - Crédit lyonnais : l’enquête - Bernard Fixot 
 Prix spécial du Jury: Florence Schaal : Recherche enfant passionnément - JC Lattès

1994 
 Prix Vérité: Emmanuelle Laborit : Le Cri de la mouette - Robert Laffont
 Prix spécial du Jury: Claire Sterling : Pax mafiosa - Robert Laffont

1993 
 Prix Vérité: David Bisson in collaboration with Evangéline de Schonen : L’Enfant derrière la porte - Éditions Grasset 
 Prix spécial du Jury: Sœur Jacques Marie : Henri Matisse la Chapelle de Vence - Ed. Grégoire Gardette

1992 
 Prix Vérité: Tracy Chamoun : Au nom du père - JC Lattès
 Prix spécial du Jury - Jean-François Deniau : Ce que je crois - Grasset

1991 
 Prix Vérité: Béatrice Saubin : L’Épreuve - Robert Laffont
 Prix spécial du Jury: Alain Woodrow : Information manipulation - Ed. du Félin

1990 
 Prix Vérité: Christiane Collange : Moi ta fille - Fayard
 Prix spécial du Jury: Michel Castex : Un mensonge gros comme le siècle - Albin Michel

1989 
 Prix Vérité: Alain Louyot : Gosses de guerre - Robert Laffont 
 Prix spécial du Jury: Pierre Richard : Un petit blond dans un grand parc -

1988 
 Prix Vérité: Roger Auque and Patrick Forestier : Un otage à Beyrouth - Filipacchi 
 Prix spécial du Jury: José Luis de Vilallonga: Ma vie est une fête - Olivier Orban

1987 
 Prix Vérité: Yves Salgues : L’Héroïne - JC Lattès

1986 
 Prix Vérité: Dominique Lapierre : La Cité de la Joie - Robert Laffont

References

External links 
 Le Cannet pourquoi le Prix Vérité n'aura lieu qu'en 2009 on Nice Matin (22 November 2008)
 Près de Nice au Cannet Le Prix Vérité-20 ans de témoignages d'actualité
 Prix littéraires du Cannet : Jean-Louis Bruguière et Hélène Mercier Arnault récompensés
 Le Cannet : un Prix pour la vérité on Paris-Côte d'Azur

Vérité
Awards established in 1986
1986 establishments in France